Karl Forsman (born 7 December 1996 in Östersund, Sweden) is a Swedish male swimmer, competing at the S5 and S6 classes, and current Paralympic Champion of the men's 100 m breaststroke (SB5).

With a silver medal from the men's 100 metre breaststroke at the 2015 IPC Swimming World Championships, Forsman qualified for the 2016 Summer Paralympics in Rio de Janeiro. Forsman won a gold medal when swimming the men's 100 m breaststroke (SB5) at the 2016 Summer Paralympics with the time 1:34:27.

References

External links 
 Profile at paralympics.se 

1996 births
Living people
People from Östersund
Paralympic swimmers of Sweden
Medalists at the 2016 Summer Paralympics
Paralympic gold medalists for Sweden
Medalists at the World Para Swimming Championships
Paralympic medalists in swimming
Swimmers at the 2016 Summer Paralympics
Swedish male breaststroke swimmers
S6-classified Paralympic swimmers
Sportspeople from Jämtland County
21st-century Swedish people